Gradojević is a village in Serbia. It is situated in the Koceljeva municipality, in the Mačva District of Central Serbia. The village had a Serb ethnic majority and a population of 250 in 2002.

Historical population

1948: 647
1953: 640
1961: 513
1971: 476
1981: 377
1991: 283
2002: 250

References

See also
List of places in Serbia

Populated places in Mačva District